Bill Wood (9 November 1921 – 11 September 1989) was an Australian rules footballer who played with Footscray in the VFL.

Career
Prior to joining Footscray he played with South Sydney where he was renowned for his goalkicking, managing 28 goals in a match against Sydney Naval in 1943. Footscray's Harry Hickey, with whom Wood served in the military, recommended him to the club and after impressing in the try outs he signed up for the 1944 season.

On debut against Collingwood he kicked 9 goals, at the time a league record and still the club record, eventually finishing the year with 51. He missed the 1945 season due to war service but returned in 1946 and topped the club's goalkicking for three successive seasons. His best tally came in 1947 when he kicked 75 goals in just 16 games. He had previously been Footscray's leading goalkicker in his debut season and for the fifth time in 1950.

Footscray made the finals in 1951 but Wood spent the entire 1st Semi Final on the bench and didn't re-sign with the club the following season.

References

External links

1921 births
Australian rules footballers from New South Wales
Western Bulldogs players
Albury Football Club players
South Sydney Football Club players
1989 deaths
Australian military personnel of World War II
Military personnel from New South Wales